Megilot Regional Council  (Mo'atza Azorit Megilot), also Megilot Dead Sea Regional Council, is a regional council in the Judean Desert of the West Bank, near the western shores of the Dead Sea. It covers six Israeli settlements. With only about 1,400 residents, it is Israel's smallest regional council. Its municipal offices are located in Vered Yeriho.

Etymology
The name "Megilot" means scrolls. It refers to the fact that the Dead Sea Scrolls were discovered in Qumran, which lies within the council's governing area, near Kalya.

Communities
There are six communities in the council: four kibbutzim, one moshav, and one other community.

Kibbutzim
Almog
Beit HaArava
Mitzpe Shalem
Kalya

Moshav
Vered Yeriho

Other community
Ovnat

References

External links
 Megilot Regional Council homepage (Hebrew)

 
Israeli regional councils in the West Bank
Judaean Desert